Aoyama Kumano Shrine is a kumano shrine in Shibuya, Tokyo, Japan.

External links
 

Kumano shrines
Shibuya